In the Family is a 1971 Brazilian drama film directed by Paulo Porto. It was entered into the 7th Moscow International Film Festival where it won a Silver Prize.

Cast
 Iracema de Alencar as Dona Lu
 Rodolfo Arena as Seu Souza
 Paulo Porto as Jorge
 Odete Lara as Neli
 Anecy Rocha as Corinha
 Procópio Ferreira as Afonsinho
 Fernanda Montenegro as Anita
 Antero de Oliveira as Roberto
 Elisa Fernandes as Suzana
 Álvaro Aguiar as Arildo

References

External links
 

1971 films
1971 drama films
Brazilian drama films
1970s Portuguese-language films